Directions to See a Ghost is the second album from rock band The Black Angels. It was released digitally on April 15, 2008 by Light in the Attic Records. However, it was not until May 13 that the CD and 3xLP were released. Those who purchased the album digitally were given a code to download the album. On or after the date of release, it was to be brought back to the place of purchase in exchange for a hard copy of the album as well as a bonus four-song EP Black Angel Exit. Moreover, Directions to See a Ghost features the song "Doves" also available on the "Doves" single 7" released the same day. Unlike the CD, the 3xLP contains bonus tracks "Surf City (Revisited)" and "Paladin's Last Stand."

The group signed to the label Suretone, owned by Interscope, for releases after this album.

Prefix called it "an easy candidate for one of the best records of the year".

According to Rolling Stone columnist David Fricke "...tripsters the Black Angels bring the aura of mid-1966 - the drilling guitars of early Velvet Underground shows, the raga inflections of late-show Fillmore jams, the acid-prayer stomp of Austin avatars the 13th Floor Elevators - everywhere they go, including the levitations on their second album, Directions to See a Ghost (Light in the Attic). Mid-Eighties echoes of Spacemen 3 and the Jesus and Mary Chain also roll through the scoured-guitar sustain and Alex Maas' rocker-monk incantations."

Track listing

Bonus tracks
 "Black Angel Exit/Shine" [iTunes]
 "Surf City (Revisited)" [LP]
 "Paladin's Last Stand" [LP]
 "No Satisfaction" [LP]

In popular culture
 "You on the Run" was featured in the 2009 film The Limits of Control.
 "Mission District" was featured in the "Dramatics, Your Honor" episode of the TV Series The Good Wife (2014).
 "Mission District" was featured in the "F is for Fire" episode of the TV Series Evil (2021).
 "Science Killer" was featured in the 2013 TV Series Longmire (S02E02).
 "Science Killer" was featured in the "A Material World" episode of the TV Series The Good Wife (2014).

References

The Black Angels (band) albums
2008 albums
Light in the Attic Records albums